The Pheasant Inn is a public house at The Pheasant Inn, Bassenthwaite, Cumbria CA13 9YE.

It is on the Campaign for Real Ale's National Inventory of Historic Pub Interiors.

References

National Inventory Pubs
Pubs in Cumbria